The 2022 United States Senate election in Washington was held on November 8, 2022, to elect a member of the United States Senate to represent the state of Washington. Incumbent Patty Murray of the Democratic Party was first elected in 1992, with 54% of the vote, filling the seat of retiring Brock Adams. Most recently, she won re-election to a fifth term in 2016 with 59% of the vote.

Because Washington has a blanket primary system, parties did not nominate their own candidates to run in the general election. Instead, every candidate appeared on the same ballot, regardless of their party affiliation. The top two candidates in the August 2 nonpartisan blanket primary then advanced to the general election. Murray received 52.2% of the primary vote and advanced to face Republican Party candidate Tiffany Smiley. 

Although Washington has been a reliably blue state for over 30 years, many polls showed that Murray only had a narrow lead over Smiley, and some polls had Smiley within the margin of error. A couple of late polls even had the two candidates tied; such polls caused most pundits to downgrade their forecast from "safe Democratic" to "likely Democratic", and Republicans believed that Smiley had a chance of pulling off an upset. Despite the predictions of a close race, Murray defeated Smiley and won re-election to a sixth term by a solid 14.5-point margin. Although this was a significantly larger margin of victory for Murray than what was expected, it was fairly consistent with Washington's partisan lean. Despite the loss, Smiley made significant gains in several counties, particularly in the Southwestern and Eastern parts of the state. Smiley conceded the following day.

Primary election

Democratic candidates

Advanced to general 
Patty Murray, incumbent U.S. Senator and Assistant Democratic Leader

Eliminated in primary 
Pano Churchill, candidate for U.S. Senate in 2016
Sam Cusmir
Ravin Pierre, aerospace engineer and data scientist
Mohammed Said, physician and perennial candidate
Bryan Solstin, aerospace engineer and software developer

Republican candidates

Advanced to general 
Tiffany Smiley, nurse

Eliminated in primary 
John Guenther, state employee
Bill Hirt, perennial candidate

Third party and independent candidates

Eliminated in primary 
 Thor Amundson (independent), candidate for U.S. Senate in 2016 and 2018 and governor in 2020
 Jon Butler (No party preference)
 Henry Clay Dennison (Socialist Workers), perennial candidate
 Dan Phan Doan (No party preference)
 Martin D. Hash (No party preference)
 Chuck Jackson (independent), candidate for U.S. Senate in 2012 and 2016
 Leon Lawson (Trump Republican), candidate for governor in 2020
 Naz Paul (independent), real estate developer
 Dave Saulibio (JFK Republican), U.S. Army veteran, candidate for Washington's 5th congressional district in 2018 and Washington's 8th congressional district in 2020

Endorsements

Results

General election

Debates
Two debates had been scheduled, the first on October 23 at Gonzaga University. Murray's campaign objected to the second on October 25 at Seattle University. Both candidates participated in a town hall style forum on October 30 in the KIRO-TV studio in Seattle.

Predictions

Endorsements

Polling
Aggregate polls

Graphical summary

Patty Murray vs. generic Republican

Patty Murray vs. generic opponent

Results

Results by county

Counties that flipped from Democratic to Republican 

 Grays Harbor (largest city: Aberdeen)
 Mason (largest city: Shelton)
 Pacific (largest city: Raymond)
 Whitman (largest city: Pullman)

By congressional district
Murray won 7 of 10 congressional districts with the remaining 3 going to Smiley, including one that elected a Democrat.

See also 
 2022 United States Senate elections

Notes

Partisan clients

References

External links 
Official campaign websites
 Patty Murray (D) for Senate
 Tiffany Smiley (R) for Senate

2022
Washington
United States Senate